Anahí Berneri (born 1975) is an Argentine film director and screenwriter. Her films have been shown at various film festivals around the world.

Selected filmography

Awards
 Teddy Award (2005)
 Silver Shell for Best Director (2017)

References

External links 

1975 births
Living people
Argentine film directors